Eisstadion Weißwasser, is an arena in Weißwasser, Germany. It is primarily used for ice hockey, and is the home to the Lausitzer Füchse of the 2nd Bundesliga. It opened in 1973 and holds 2,750 spectators.

References

Indoor arenas in Germany
Indoor ice hockey venues in Germany
Buildings and structures in Görlitz (district)
Sports venues in Saxony